Cabralzinho might refer to:

Carlos Roberto Cabral, Brazilian football manager
Cabralzinho, Macapá, a district of that city